State Route 99 (SR-99) is a state highway in the US state of Utah providing a business loop around I-15 for the town of Fillmore in the central portion of the state. The route is the main street for the town and spans . The highway was established 1969 as I-15 was constructed through the area, replacing US-91.

Route description
The highway begins at a diamond interchange on I-15 at exit 163 heading southeast. Immediately past the interchange, the road turns northeast outside of Fillmore. Approaching the south city limits, the route turns east and becomes 500 South. In the south-central part of town, the road turns north onto Main Street and widens to four lanes at this point. Before intersecting at SR-100, the road loses two lanes at 300 North. The highway passes Paradise Resort Golf Course before turning northwest and terminating at another diamond interchange at I-15, exit 167.

Photo Gallery

History
State Route 99 was established in 1969 coinciding with the construction of I-15 in Millard County, providing a connection from two exits north and south of Fillmore. US-91 was routed along this road but as I-15 was replacing US-91, the state assumed maintenance of the road. Previously, State Route 99 was assigned to a road also in Millard County that linked the Topaz War Relocation Center used in World War II.

Major intersections

References

099
 099
Streets in Utah